Thirumeninathar temple (also called Boominathar temple or Tiruchuli temple) is a Hindu temple dedicated to the deity Shiva, located in  Tiruchuli in Virudhunagar district, in the South Indian state of Tamil Nadu. Shiva is worshipped as Thirumeninathar, and is represented by the lingam. His consort Parvati is depicted as Thunaimalaiyammai Amman. The temple is located on the Virudhunagar–Manamadurai road. The presiding deity is revered in the 7th century Tamil Saiva canonical work, the Tevaram, written by Tamil saint poets known as the nayanmars and classified as Paadal Petra Sthalam. The temple is closely associated with Sundarar, who has sung praises about the presiding deity. This shrine is regarded as the 12th of the Tevara Stalams in the Pandya region of Tamil Nadu.

The temple complex covers an area of two and half acres and all its shrines are enclosed with concentric rectangular walls. The temple has a number of shrines, with those of Thirumeninathar, his consort Thunaimalai Amman and Pralayavitankar being the most prominent. The temple has three daily rituals at various times from 6:00 a.m. to 8:30 p.m., and many yearly festivals on its calendar. The Thirukalyana festival during the Tamil month of Panguni (February–March) and Chitra Pournamai are the most prominent festivals celebrated in the temple.

Tiruchli is the birthplace of Ramana Maharishi, a prominent Saivite saint. The original complex is believed to have been built by Pandyas, with later additions from different ruling dynasties. In modern times, the temple is maintained and administered by the Hindu Religious and Charitable Endowments Department of the Government of Tamil Nadu.

Legend 

The Dinakareswara Lingam was worshipped by the Sun, according to the legends associated with this temple. Parvati is said to have meditated upon Shiva, seeking his hand in marriage; this event is commemorated in the Amman Tapas Utsavam in the month of Aadi for 10 days each year. The place is believed to have been the one where Shiva diverted the floods away from the place during the great deluge. Since Shiva swirled floods here, the place came to be known as Tiruchuli (Chuli Tamil means swirl). Sundaramoorthy Nayanar is believed to have visited this temple with the Chera King Cheramaan Perumal. Shiva appeared in the dreams of Sundarar while he was staying at this place in a Mutt. He appeared as a young individual with a golden bouquet in his hand and a swirl in his head. The presiding deity is believed to have been worshipped by Vishnu, Indra, Brahma, Sun, Bhoomidevi, sage Gowthama, Agaliga, Kanva, Arjuna, Chitrangadai and Cheraman Perumal. Tiruchli is the birthplace of Ramana Maharishi, a prominent Saivite saint.

Architecture

This temple is located 55 km from Madurai. The nearest town Aruppukottai is about 15 km away from this temple. There are several shrines and waterbodies within this temple complex and around it. The Shiva and Ambal shrines both face the East. The presiding deity lord Shiva is called as Tirumeni Nathar, Bhoominathar and the his consort Parvathy is called as Tunaimaalainayaki. The presiding deity Thirueninathar is housed in the sanctum that has a moat surrounding it. The image of Thirumeninathar is in the form of a square-shaped Linga. of The Kauvaikkadal tank with a central mandapam is located axial to the sanctum and outside the entrance tower. There are shrines of Pralaya Vitankar and the Palani Andavar in this temple. The sthala vriksham (temple tree) is Punnai tree and the Theertham is Kauvaikkadal tank. The temple is approached via Kudavarai entrance and the Kambathadi hall is located near the entrance. The Sabha hall houses the image of Nataraja. The hall also houses the image of sage Gowthama and Akalika. The Ambal shrine also faces East and has a separate parallel entrance. The hall opposite to the sanctum of Ambal has a Srichakra in the ceiling.

Architecturally, the temple is considered similar to that of Madurai Meenakshi Amman temple and Rameswaram temple. The Ramanathapuram rulers have traditionally maintained this temple. In modern times, the temple is maintained and administered by the Hindu Religious and Charitable Endowments Department of the Government of Tamil Nadu.

Festivals

Sundarar, an 8th-century Tamil Saivite poet, venerated Bhaktajaneswarar in ten verses in Tevaram, compiled as the Ninth Tirumurai. As the temple is revered in Tevaram, it is classified as Paadal Petra Sthalam, one of the 276 temples that find mention in the Saiva canon. 

The temple priests perform the puja (rituals) during festivals and on a daily basis. The temple rituals are performed three times a day; Kalasanthi at 8:00 a.m., Uchikalam at 12:00 a.m. and Sayarakshai at 6:00 p.m. Each ritual comprises four steps: abhisheka (sacred bath), alangaram (decoration), naivethanam (food offering) and deepa aradanai (waving of lamps) for Bhaktajaneswarar and Gnanambigai. Unlike other shiva temples, anointing with oil is not performed in the temple. The prime festival, the Bhrammotsavam is celebrated during the Tamil month of Panguni (April0 May). The other festivals celebrated are the Palani Andavar festival in Thai and The Amman Tapas festival is celebrated during the Tamil month of Aadi.

References

External links

Hindu temples in Virudhunagar district
Tourist attractions in Madurai
Padal Petra Stalam